The women's BMX event at the 2015 European Games in Baku took place on 26 and 28 June.

Schedule
All times are Azerbaijan Summer Time (UTC+5).

Results

Time trials

Motos

Heat 1

Heat 2

Final

References

External links

Women's BMX
2015 in women's BMX